The following is a list of the Czech Republic women's national rugby union team matches.

Overall 

The Czech Republic's overall international match record against all nations is as follows:

Full internationals

2000s

2010s

2020s

Other internationals

References 

Czech Republic